Italy competed at the 2017 World Aquatics Championships in Budapest, Hungary from 14 July to 30 July. Like the previous edition in 2015, it won at least one medal in all but one discipline: this time, both waterpolo teams were eliminated in quarterfinals, while in high diving Alessandro De Rose won the bronze, the first medal for Italy in this discipline.

Medalists

Diving

Italy entered 11 divers (eight male and three female).

Men

Women

Mixed

High diving

Italy qualified one male high diver.

Open water swimming

Italy entered ten open water swimmers.

Swimming

Italian swimmers achieved qualifying standards in the following events (up to a maximum of 2 swimmers in each event at the A-standard entry time, and 1 at the B-standard):

Men

Women

Mixed

Synchronized swimming

Italy's synchronized swimming team consisted of 14 athletes (1 male and 13 female).

Women

Mixed

 Legend: (R) = Reserve Athlete

Water polo

Men's tournament

Team roster

Stefano Tempesti
Francesco Di Fulvio
Niccolo Gitto
Pietro Figlioli
Nicholas Presciutti
Cristiano Mirachi
Alessandro Nora
Andrea Fondelli
Vincenzo Renzuto Iodice
Michaël Bodegas
Matteo Aicardi
Zeno Bertoli
Goran Volarević

Group play

Playoffs

Quarterfinals

5th–8th place semifinals

Fifth place game

Women's tournament

Team roster

Giukia Gorlero
Chiara Tabani
Arianna Garibotti
Elisa Queirolo
Federica Radicchi
Rosaria Aiello
Domitilla Picozzi
Roberta Bianconi
Giulia Emmolo
Valeria Palmieri
Aleksandra Cotti
Sara Dario
Federica Eugenia Lavi

Group play

Quarterfinals

5th–8th place semifinals

Fifth place game

See also
 Italy at the World Aquatics Championships

References

External links
 Official site of the Italian Swimming Federation  

Nations at the 2017 World Aquatics Championships
Italy at the World Aquatics Championships
2017 in Italian sport